Neptune's fields (Swedish: Neptuni åkrar) is a nature reserve in the north of the island of Öland, Sweden. Located in Borgholm Municipality along the Kalmar Strait, north of the village of Byxelkrok, it consists of a long stretch of cobble beach covered with Echium vulgare which blossoms in June and July, coloring the entire area blue. The cobble stones result from stones left during the last ice age that eroded through the action of the waves, and they are interspersed with fossils from Trilobites and Brachiopods.

The place is a well-known tourist attraction. It was named by Carl Linnaeus, who visited the place on his 1741 journey to the island.

Tumulus and gravefield 

Just south of the Neptune's fields is the Forgalla Skepp, a Bronze Age ship shaped tumulus, and a grave field. The latter measures  and contains 32 small stone circles, nine cists, twelve round cairns, and one in the shape of a three pointed star (treudd).

A bit further south, just a kilometer north of Byxelkrok, is Höga Flisa 

References

External links

Area entry at Swedish National Heritage Board

Nature reserves in Sweden
Öland